Piverone is a comune (municipality) in the Metropolitan City of Turin in the Italian region Piedmont, located about  northeast of Turin.

Piverone borders the following municipalities: Palazzo Canavese, Zimone, Magnano, Albiano d'Ivrea, Azeglio, and Viverone.

Twin towns
 Dég, Hungary

References

External links
 Official website

Cities and towns in Piedmont